Beare is a surname. Notable people with the surname include:

 Arthur Beare (disambiguation), multiple people
 Charles Beare (born 1937), British violin expert
 Donal Cam O'Sullivan Beare (1561–1618), ruler of the O'Sullivan clan
 Ellis Beare, English politician
 Garin Beare (born 1939), Zimbabwean bowler
 Gary Beare (born 1952), American baseball player
 George Beare (disambiguation), multiple people
 Gerry Beare (1905–1983), Australian rules footballer
 Hedley Beare (1932–2010), Australian educator and author
 James Beare, English mariner
 John Beare (1820–1914), Canadian farmer
 Jon Beare (born 1974), Canadian rower
 Kathryn Beare (1917–1997), American baseball player
 Lisa Beare (born 1975), Canadian politician
 Nikki Beare (1928–2014), American journalist and lobbyist
 Norah Beare (born 1946), Northern Irish politician
 Philip O'Sullivan Beare (c. 1590–1660), Irish soldier and author
 Simon Beare (born 1979), New Zealand cricketer
 Sir Thomas Hudson Beare (1859–1940), British engineer
 Thomas Hudson Beare (1792–1861), British settler

In Fiction
Maggie Beare and Arthur Beare, main characters in the Australian TV series Mother and Son, played by Ruth Cracknell and Garry McDonald